Reinhard Mager (born 2 May 1953) is a German former professional footballer who played as a goalkeeper.

References

External links
 

1953 births
Living people
German footballers
Association football goalkeepers
Bundesliga players
2. Bundesliga players
BSV 07 Schwenningen players
VfL Bochum players
Blau-Weiß 1890 Berlin players
Hertha BSC players